Maackiana is a genus of flies in the family Stratiomyidae.

Species
Maackiana circularis (Nagatomi, 1975)
Maackiana laminiformis Krivosheina, 1973

References

Stratiomyidae
Brachycera genera
Diptera of Asia